Luigi Chierchia (born 1957) is an Italian mathematician, specializing in nonlinear differential equations, mathematical physics, and dynamical systems (celestial mechanics and Hamiltonian systems).

Chierchia studied physics and mathematics at the Sapienza University of Rome with Laurea degree in 1981 with supervisor Giovanni Gallavotti. After a year of military service, Chierchia studied mathematics at the Courant Institute of New York University and received his PhD there in 1985. His doctoral dissertation Quasi-Periodic Schrödinger Operators in One Dimension, Absolutely Continuous Spectra, Bloch Waves and integrable Hamiltonian Systems was supervised by Henry P. McKean. As a postdoc, Chierchia studied at the University of Arizona, ETH Zurich and the École Polytechnique in Paris. Since 2002 he has been Professor of Mathematical Analysis at Roma Tre University.

With Fabio Pusateri and his doctoral student Gabriella Pinzari, he succeeded in extending the KAM theorem for the three-body problem to the n-body problem. In KAM theory, Chierchia addressed invariant tori in phase-space Hamiltonian systems and stability questions. He has also done research on Arnold diffusion, spectral theory of the quasiperiodic one-dimensional Schrödinger equation, and analogs of KAM theory in infinite-dimensional Hamiltonian systems and partial differential equations (almost periodic nonlinear wave equations).

He was an invited speaker (with Gabriella Pinzari) at the International Congress of Mathematicians in Seoul in 2014, and at the conference Dynamics, Equations and Applications in Kraków in 2019.

Selected publications

References

External links

1957 births
Living people
21st-century Italian mathematicians
20th-century Italian mathematicians
Sapienza University of Rome
Courant Institute of Mathematical Sciences alumni
Academic staff of Roma Tre University
PDE theorists